Germán Sopeña (1946–2001) was an Argentine writer and journalist.

Argentine male writers
Argentine journalists
Male journalists
People from Córdoba Province, Argentina
1946 births
2001 deaths
20th-century journalists